Caput Medusae is Latin for "head of Medusa". It may also refer to:

Medusa's head, a part of the constellation Perseus
Caput medusae, distended and engorged paraumbilical veins
Gorgoneion (Γοργόνειον), Greek for "head of Gorgon". Athena fixed the "head of Medusa" into center of her shield, aegis (αιγίς).